Mustilia terminata is a moth in the Endromidae family. It was described by Yang in 1995. It is found in China (Guangxi).

The wingspan is about 52 mm. Adults are red-brown and similar to Mustllla orthocosta.

References

Moths described in 1995
Mustilia